Carlo Giuliano (1831–1895) was a goldsmith and jeweller operating in London from 1860. He started work in Naples for Alessandro Castellani and was sent to London to establish a branch of the Casa Castellani. He left Castellani's employ in the early 1860s and in turn worked for Robert Phillips, Harry Emanuel, Hunt & Roskell, and Hancocks & Co - all leading London jewellers. In 1875, he set out on his own, starting a retail outlet at 115 Piccadilly, and specialising in Renaissance-style design.

References

Further reading
 Dr. A. E. Alexander (1975) The Jewels of Fortunato Pio Castellani And Carlo Giuliano, pp.  20–26. Gemological Institute of America, USA, Vol. 15, No. 2 (Summer 1975)

Bibliography
Castellani and Giuliano: Revivalist Jewellers of the Nineteenth Century - G. C Munn (1984) Geoffrey Munn

External links

Inspiration for Gothic Renaissance Revival Style Jewels

1831 births
1895 deaths
Italian goldsmiths
Italian jewellers
19th-century Neapolitan people
Piccadilly
Burials at Kensal Green Cemetery
Italian emigrants to the United Kingdom